The 2011–12 Adelaide United FC season was the club's seventh A-League season. It includes the 2011–12 A-League season as well as any other competitions of the 2011–12 football season.

Season overview 
As of 1 April 2011, all A-League clubs were able to negotiate new kit supplier deals as the previous contract with Reebok had elapsed and as such, Adelaide United negotiated a three-year deal with Erreà.

Off-season transfers marked the departure of long serving players Travis Dodd, Lucas Pantelis and Robert Cornthwaite, and of fan favourites Mathew Leckie and Marcos Flores to overseas clubs. In a coup for the club and the A-League, Rini Coolen managed to secure the signatures of Socceroos Bruce Djite, Jon McKain and Dario Vidošić; with the latter being offered the Australian marquee player status at the club for the season. The signing of Ukrainian international, Evgeniy Levchenko completed Adelaide's foreign player quota.

It was announced at the season launch gala dinner on 26 August that the club's captain for the season would be Jon McKain, with Cássio and Eugene Galeković named as vice-captains.

During the last weeks of the off-season in September, Adelaide recruited its final players to complete the squad for the season. Ricardo Da Silva was scouted and signed from local South Australian Super League outfit, Adelaide City, whilst double-winning defenders Milan Susak and Antony Golec were signed to add extra depth to the squad.

On 30 September 2011, the club announced its intention to purchase the Veneto Club complex located in Beverley, South Australia for an estimated $4 million and rename it the "Reds Centre". It is proposed that the refurbished facilities will be used as the club's permanent training venue for the players as well as for hosting post-match gatherings. On 12 December 2011 it became evident that the deal had fallen through due to unacceptable changes made to the contract between land owners and the club. The Veneto Centre was soon thereafter sold to Royal Park Salvage, despite the final sale not being announced.

On 18 December 2011 it was announced that head coach Rini Coolen had been sacked and replaced by former coach John Kosmina as caretaker coach for the rest of the season, including the AFC Champions League group stage of 2012. As part of Kosmina's takeover of the head coaching position, Eugene Galeković was named club captain on 28 December 2011, replacing Jon McKain.

Players

Squad information

Players in / out 

Re-signed

In

Out

Player statistics

Squad stats

Delisted players

Disciplinary records

A-League

Scorers

A-League

Club

Coaching staff

Managerial Changes

Attendance at home games 

* Note: The Round 6 away match against Gold Coast United was moved from Skilled Park to Hindmarsh Stadium and re-classified as an Adelaide United home game.

Competitions

Overall

Pre-season

A-League

League table

Results summary

Results by round

Matches 

* Note: The Round 6 away match against Gold Coast United was moved from Skilled Park to Hindmarsh Stadium and re-classified as an Adelaide United home game.
† Note: The Round 24 home match against Perth Glory was moved from 4 to 1 March to accommodate AFC Champions League participation.

AFC Champions League

Qualifying play-off

Group stage

Round of 16

Quarter-finals

References

External links 
 Official website

2011–12
2011–12 A-League season by team